Sonja Savić (15 September 1961 – 23 September 2008) was a Serbian actress, famous for her husky voice and series of impressive roles in some of the more memorable 1980s Yugoslav films. Sonja appeared in Miroslav Ilić video Voleo sam devojku iz grada. In later years she became an outspoken critic of the direction the country was taking, in terms of cultural and political values.

She was born in Čačak, Serbia and died in Belgrade, Serbia; the cause of death was initially reported to be a drug overdose.

Filmography

Leptirov Oblak (Butterfly's Cloud) as Lila, 1977
Ljubavni život Budimira Trajkovića (Beloved Love) as Girl from Discothèque, 1977
Lude godine as Lidija, 1978
Die rote Zora und ihre Bande (The Outsiders of Uskoken Castle) as Zlata, 1979 (TV Series)
Zvezde koje ne tamne (Stars That Don't Fade) as Sonja, 1980
Lagani povratak (Easy Comeback), 1981
Verenica (The Fiancée), 1982
Živeti kao sav normalan svet (Living Like the Rest of Us), 1982
Kože (Leathers) as Safija, 1982 (TV Series)
Četvrtak umesto petka (Thursday Instead of Friday) as Girl, 1982 (TV)
Nešto između (Something in Between) as Tvigica, 1983
Karlovački doživljaji 1889 as Milica, 1983 (TV)
Šećerna vodica (Sugar Water) as Branka Đurić-Dečka, 1983
Balkanski špijun (Balkan Spy) as Sonja Čvorović, 1984
Divlja patka (Wild Duck) as Hedviga, 1984 (TV)
Davitelj protiv davitelja (Strangler vs Strangler) as Sofija, 1984
U srcu moje plavuše, 1984
Kamiondžije opet voze (Truckdrivers Rides Again) as Anđelija, 1984
Uvek sa vama (Always with You) as Fat Girl, 1984 (TV Series)
Una as Una, 1984
Formula 1, 1984 (TV Series)
Gospođica Julija (Miss Julija) as Julija, 1985 (TV)
Život je lep (Life is Beautiful) as Singer, 1985
Crna Marija (Black Mary) as Anja, 1986
Majstor i Šampita as Sonja Marković – Šampita, 1986
Sekula i njegove žene (Sekula and his Women) as Spasenija, 1986
Noć punog meseca (Night of a Full Moon) as Sonja, 1986 (TV Series)
Telefonomanija (Phonemania), 1987 (TV)
I to se zove sreća (And You Call That Luck), 1987 (TV Series)
Osuđeni (Sentenced) as Judge's daughter, 1987
Čavka as Teacher #2, 1988
Braća po materi (Maternal Halfbrothers) as Anica, 1988
The Dark Side of the Sun (film), 1988
Masmediologija na Balkanu as Slavka, 1989
Kako je propao rokenrol (The Fall of Rock'n'Roll) as Bojana, 1989
Balkanska perestrojka as Slavka, 1990
Mi nismo anđeli (We Are Not Angels) as Marta, 1992
Uvod u drugi život, 1992
Život i delo Danila Kiša (Life and Literature – Danilo Kiš), 1994 (TV)
Ni na nebu ni na zemlji, 1994
Otvorena vrata (Door Opened) as Blonde, 1995 (TV Series)
Urnebesna tragedija (Tragédie burlesque) as Violeta, 1995
Ivan, 1997 (TV)
Tango je tužna misao koja se pleše, 1997
Senke uspomena (Shadows of Memories) as Theater Cashier, 2000
Kruh in mleko (Bread and Milk) as Sonja, 2001
Virtuelna stvarnost (Virtual Reality) as Nina, 2001
Donau, Duna, Dunaj, Dunav, Dunarea (The Danube) as Tamara, 2003
Žurka (The Party) as Đina, 2004
Desperado Tonic as fatal woman – a vampire, 2004
Od groba do groba (Gravehopping) as Ida, 2005
Jug jugoistok (South by Southeast), 2005
Princ od papira as Eva, 2008
Vratiće se rode as Darinka, 2007 (TV series)

References

External links

1961 births
2008 deaths
20th-century Serbian actresses
Golden Arena winners
People from Čačak
Drug-related deaths in Serbia
Deaths by heroin overdose
Serbian film actresses
Yugoslav film actresses
21st-century Serbian actresses
Serbian child actresses
Yugoslav child actresses